Deseret is a Unicode block containing characters in the Deseret alphabet, which were invented by the Church of Jesus Christ of Latter-day Saints (LDS Church) to write English. The Deseret block was derived from an earlier private use encoding in the ConScript Unicode Registry, like the Shavian and Phaistos Disc encodings. The block was added in version 3.1 of the Unicode Standard; the letters Oi and Ew, both uppercase and lowercase, were added in version 4.0.

History
The following Unicode-related documents record the purpose and process of defining specific characters in the Deseret block:

References 

Unicode blocks